WD repeat and HMG-box DNA binding protein 1 is a protein in humans that is encoded by the WDHD1 gene.

The protein encoded by this gene contains multiple N-terminal WD40 domains and a C-terminal high mobility group (HMG) box. WD40 domains are found in a variety of eukaryotic proteins and may function as adaptor/regulatory modules in signal transduction, pre-mRNA processing and cytoskeleton assembly. HMG boxes are found in many eukaryotic proteins involved in chromatin assembly, transcription and replication. Alternative splicing results in two transcript variants encoding different isoforms. [provided by RefSeq, Jul 2008].

References

Further reading